The Popery Act 1627 (3 Chas. 1, c. 3) was an Act of Parliament passed by the Parliament of England. Its long title is "An Act to restrain the passing or sending of any to be Popishly bred beyond the Seas". This was the only penal law to be passed during the reign of Charles I.

The Act declared:

Forasmuch as divers ill affected Persons to the true Religion within this Realm, had sent their Children into Foreign Parts to be bred up in Popery, notwithstanding the Restraint of it by 1 Jac. 1. In case of Conformity, these Penalties are not to be incurred; and in case the Lands have been , they shall be restored.

Notes

Acts of the Parliament of England
1627 in law